High Desert State Prison may refer to:

High Desert State Prison (California)
High Desert State Prison (Nevada)